Clinton Spur is a rock spur on the south side of Dufek Massif,  southeast of Neuburg Peak, in the Pensacola Mountains. It was mapped by the United States Geological Survey from surveys and from U.S. Navy air photos, 1956–66, and named by the Advisory Committee on Antarctic Names for Lieutenant Clinton R. Smith, (MC) U.S. Navy, of the Ellsworth Station winter party, 1957.

References 

Ridges of Queen Elizabeth Land